Great Santa Cruz Island is a small inhabited island in Zamboanga City in the southern region of the Philippines that is famous for its pink coralline sand. The color of the sand comes from the pulverized red organ pipe coral from eons of surf erosion mixed with the white sand.

The island started to become popular since the 1970s and early 1980s when it was frequented by German, Japanese and Italian tourists. Recently, there's an upsurge of tourists that has been recorded due to its rising popularity as one of a handful of Pink Sand Beaches in the World and is the only one in Asia. In 2017, it was recognized by National Geographic as one of the 21 Best Beaches in the World.

Conservation
The Great Santa Cruz Island together with Little Santa Cruz Island are protected areas in Region 9 of the Philippines. Jointly called the Great and Little Sta. Cruz Islands Protected Landscape & Seascape, it was declared as such on April 23, 2000 with the signing of Proclamation No. 271.

Recent illegal coral reef mining has destroyed most of Great Santa Cruz Island's vast coral reef population leaving the former colorful corals as dead skeletal reefs. The city government of Zamboanga is planning to improve the island for the preservation, protection, conservation and rehabilitation of the island's ecosystem. The plan also involves developing the island for ecotourism. The improvement would include rehabilitating the present structures on the island. New infrastructures that need to be constructed would be low in profile using materials indigenous to the area, in hope of lessening its impact to the environment. The development plan is expected to be completed in 3 to 5 years time.

Getting to the island
A trip to the island is booked inside Paseo del Mar.

Gallery

See also 
 List of protected areas of the Philippines
 List of islands in the Philippines

References

External links
 
 Great Santa Cruz Island at OpenStreetMap
 Great Santa Cruz Island Guide

Islands of Zamboanga City
Beaches of the Philippines
Protected landscapes and seascapes of the Philippines
Tourist attractions in Zamboanga City